Rhododendron cyanocarpum is an evergreen shrub or small tree with leathery leaves and fragrant white or pink tinged flowers that are bell or funnel shaped. It is threatened by habitat loss.

It was originally discovered by Père Jean Marie Delavay, but later introduced to western horticulture by the Scottish botanist George Forrest in 1902.

References

External links

Flora of China
cyanocarpum
Vulnerable plants
Taxonomy articles created by Polbot